The New Caledonia national basketball team are the basketball side that represent New Caledonia in international competitions, organized and run by the Région Fédérale de Nouvelle Calédonie de Basketball. (New Caledonia Basketball Federation)

Judged by the medals at the Oceania Basketball Tournament, New Caledonia is Oceania's fourth most successful basketball nation (only behind Australia, New Zealand,  Guam and tied with the remaining others in last place).

Competitive record

Pacific Games Tournament

1963 : 5
1966 :  
1969 : 
1971 : ?
1975 : 
1979 : ?
1983 : ? 
1987 : 4th
1991 : ?
1995 : 
1999 : 
2003 : 
2007 : 4th
2011 : 
2015 : 7th
2019 : 5th
2023 : To be determined

FIBA Oceania Championship

Oceania Basketball Tournament

1981 : ?
1985 : ? 
1989 : ?
1993 : ?
1997 : ?
2001 : 
2005 : 
2009 : 
2013 : ?

Melanesian Basketball Cup

 2017 : 
 2022 : To be determined

Current roster
At the 2019 Pacific Games:

Depth chart

Head coach position
  Cyril Metzdorf – 2013–2015
  Benjamin Guy – 2019

Past rosters
At the 2015 Pacific Games:

Kit

Manufacturer
2019: owayo GmbH

See also
 New Caledonia women's national basketball team
 New Caledonia national under-19 basketball team
 New Caledonia national under-17 basketball team
 New Caledonia national 3x3 team

References

2007 New Caledonia National Basketball Team information

External links
FIBA Profile
New Caledonia Basketball Records at FIBA Archive
Australiabasket - New Caledonia Men National Team

Men's national basketball teams
Basketball
Basketball teams in New Caledonia
1974 establishments in New Caledonia